Don García de Silva Figueroa (December 29, 1550 – July 22, 1624) was a Spanish diplomat, and the first Western traveller to correctly identify the ruins of Takht-e Jamshid in Persia as the location of Persepolis, the ancient capital of the Achaemenid Empire and one of the great cities of antiquity.

Life and work 

De Silva was born in Zafra in the Spanish province of Badajoz. He served in the military in Flanders, and later was appointed governor of Badajoz. In 1612, Philip III, King of both Spain and Portugal, chose De Silva as his ambassador to the court of Shah Abbas, the Safavid monarch. Before he could reach Persia, however, De Silva was detained in Goa due to his strong disagreements with its Portuguese viceroy, and he did not arrive at his destination until October 1617.

De Silva's embassy was Philip III's return to the two Abbas I had sent to him shortly before, one of them in the person of the Englishman Robert Shirley and the other in the ones of the Persian Dengiz Beg and the Portuguese Augustinian friar Antonio de Gouvea.

During his stay in Persia, De Silva dealt with various diplomatic issues of importance, including the sealing of an alliance against the Ottoman Empire, a longstanding enemy of the three powers involved: Persia, Portugal and Spain.

De Silva travelled extensively throughout Persia, visiting the cities of Shiraz, Qom and Isfahan among others. He went to see the ruins of Persepolis, and described its splendours in a vivid letter to Alfonso de la Cueva, marqués de Bedmar. This letter made a great impression in the learned circles of Europe, and was quickly translated into Latin and English. In Isfahan he met the Italian traveller Pietro della Valle, who later went to Goa following the way De Silva had done to reach there.

On his travels, De Silva had amassed a large collection of rare art objects; these he tried to take home with him to Spain when his sojourn ended in 1619. He wrote a full account of his travels under the title Totius legationis suae et Indicarum rerum Persidisque commentarii. It was translated into French by the Dutchman Abraham de Wicquefort in 1667. The original manuscript is preserved today in the National Library in Madrid, and was published completely for the first time there in 1903.

De Silva's memoirs contain a great deal of detailed information relating to Persian geography, history and culture. He described, among many other things, the funerary practices of the Zoroastrians, the sport of organized bull-fighting in Persian towns, and the cultivation of date palms in southern Iran. His narrative is now regarded as a valuable source document on early 17th-century Persia.

De Silva's return trip to Spain was eventful and frustrating. He reached Ormuz and Goa in 1621, and then, in 1622, Mozambique, but too late in season to round the Cape of Good Hope he had to go back again to Goa. When, after a long delay, he was able to re-embark for Spain, he died at sea before reaching his destination.

Fictional character 
García de Silva y Figueroa becomes the star of the horror and mystery story Denn die Toten segeln schnell ("Because the dead sail quickly"), by the Spanish writer Salomé Guadalupe Ingelmo. The text is part of the anthology Lo Siniestro.

Portraits 
In 2017, inspired by the physical description that Pietro Della Valle left of the Spanish ambassador to the Shah of Persia, the Spanish painter Alejandro Cabeza made a portrait in oil on canvas through which he offers a careful physiognomic reconstruction of García de Silva.

See also
Robert Shirley
Thomas Shirley
Anthony Shirley

References

Bibliography
 .

External links 
 

1550 births
1624 deaths
People from Zafra
Explorers of Asia
Explorers from Extremadura
Spanish art collectors
16th-century Spanish people
17th-century Spanish people
17th-century Spanish writers
17th-century travel writers
Spanish travel writers
Ambassadors of the Spanish Empire to Safavid Iran
People who died at sea
Explorers of Iran
17th-century diplomats
University of Salamanca alumni
Ambassadors of Spain